Mateusz Sopoćko (born 26 June 1999) is a Polish professional footballer who most recently played as a midfielder for Warta Poznań.

Club career
His first club was Akademia Piłkarska Lechia Gdańsk. In 2018, he joined the Ekstraklasa side of Lechia Gdańsk and made his debut in a 0–0 draw against Legia Warsaw. On 27 January 2021, Sopoćko completed a move to Warta Poznań.

Career statistics

Club

Honours
Lechia Gdańsk
Polish Cup: 2018–19

References

External links

 

1999 births
Living people
Sportspeople from Gdańsk
Polish footballers
Association football midfielders
Lechia Gdańsk players
Podbeskidzie Bielsko-Biała players
Warta Poznań players
Ekstraklasa players
I liga players
IV liga players